The Iglesia del Sacramento (Spanish for 'Church of the Sacrament') is a 17th-century, Baroque-style, Roman Catholic church located in Madrid, Spain. Since 1980 is the Military Cathedral of Spain and the seat of the Military Archbishop of Spain. It was declared Bien de Interés Cultural in 1982.

See also
 Catholic Church in Spain
 List of oldest church buildings
 Monument to victims of the attack against Alfonso XIII

References 

Roman Catholic churches in Madrid
Bien de Interés Cultural landmarks in Madrid
Roman Catholic churches completed in 1615
Roman Catholic churches completed in 1744
Baroque architecture in Madrid
1615 establishments in Spain
Buildings and structures in Palacio neighborhood, Madrid
Cathedrals of military ordinariates
17th-century Roman Catholic church buildings in Spain
18th-century Roman Catholic church buildings in Spain